WDDW (104.7 FM) is a Spanish language radio station licensed to Sturtevant, Wisconsin, and serving the Milwaukee and Racine area from studios located on South 108th Street in West Allis. It is owned by Bustos Media. WDDW is also known as "La Gran D" (sounded out as "La Grande", using the Spanish pronunciation of the letter "D"), and plays traditional regional/Mexican music, with a second station, W229CQ (93.7), translated via WDDW's HD Radio HD2 subchannel and carrying older regional/traditional music and some current tracks under the branding "La Z 93.7". WDDW transmits from the former WMLW-TV analog-era tower northwest of the Oak Creek Power Plant in Oak Creek, with W229CQ's transmitter located atop the Hilton Milwaukee City Center. Both signals optimally target Milwaukee's core south side Hispanic neighborhoods.

History
The frequency was licensed on September 26, 1989 as WZXA, and finally signed on the air June 18, 1993.

Hot adult contemporary (1994-1997) 
In 1994, the station aired a mixture of satellite and local hot adult contemporary as "Sunny 104.7", targeting Racine and Kenosha with their transmitter site located in Franksville, Wisconsin. The station was owned by Pride Communications.

Country (1997-2005) 
In the spring of 1997, WZXA flipped to current country music as WEXT "Extreme Country 104.7". Pride Communications was sold to NextMedia in 2000, though no major format changes were made. In February 2004 NextMedia turned on their new Oak Creek transmitter, which gave the station an improved signal into the Milwaukee area. The format was tweaked on March 6, 2004, when it evolved into a mixture of current and classic country as "104-7 The Wolf". Instead of a jingle, The Wolf would usually play a wolf howling between songs.

Spanish (2005-present) 
On October 13, 2005, Bustos Media agreed to purchase the station from NextMedia Group for $10.2 million, with the intention of flipping to a Spanish-language format. On September 15, 2005, prior to Bustos taking over the station, WEXT dropped its country format and redirect listeners to FM106 WMIL-FM and began simulcasting then-sister station WIIL Kenosha. To advertise the end that morning, The Wolf replaced the wolf-howling sound effect with the sound of a dying wolf howling. The Wolf signed off with Blackhawk's "Goodbye Says It All". The new format, with new call sign WDDW, launched the next day after a promotional loop, becoming the Milwaukee area's first-ever full-time Spanish language FM station; the Milwaukee Hispanic Chamber Of Commerce officially launched the station with the song  "El Aretito" by Los Morros Del Norte at 11:50 a.m. that day, a couple hours later than the intended 10:00 a.m. launch in order to have a proper launch from their new temporary studios in Kenosha.

In September 2010, Bustos transferred most of its licenses to Adelante Media Group as part of a settlement with its lenders. Bustos Media bought WDDW back from Adelante for $1 million on July 31, 2015.

In July 2016, WDDW launched their HD2 subchannel carrying older music after an earlier upgrade to the transmitter to allow HD radio operations; as mentioned above, the signal is translated into analog form over W229CQ from downtown Milwaukee.  The signal and subchannel signed on in mid-July with a loop of "Macarena" by Los Del Río before "La 93.7" launched at 5:42 PM on the 21st. The signal is purposefully directed southward to prevent interference with Sheboygan's WBFM and Grand Rapids' WBCT on the same frequency.

Past logos

References

Cheers greet switch to Spanish
Spanish-language radio station gets new owner
Bustos Media press release

External links
WDDW official website

DDW
DDW
Radio stations established in 1993
1993 establishments in Wisconsin